The Uttarakhand Public Service Commission or UKPSC  is the state agency authorized to conduct the Civil Services Examination for entry-level appointments to the various Civil Services of state of Uttarakhand. 

The Uttarakhand Public Service Commission has been constituted under the provisions of Article 315 of the Constitution of India by the Governor of Uttarakhand vide notification no. 247/1 Personnel 2001 dated 14th March, 2001 (Annexure 1). The commission came into existence on 15th May, 2001. The sanctioned strength of the Commission is the Chairperson and six Members (Annexure 2).

The functioning of the Uttarakhand Public Service Commission is governed by the Uttarakhand Public Service Commission Procedure and Conduct of Business Rules 2013 {under section 11 of the U.P. prepared by the Public Service Commission Uttarakhand. State Public Service Commission (Regulation of Procedure) Act, 1985 Uttarakhand Adaptation and Modification Order, 2002}

Examinations conducted
List of Examinations Conducted by the Uttarakhand Public Service Commission time to time. (Direct recruitment through interviews only as per the service rules of various posts)
Combined State/Upper Subordinate Preliminary Examination.
Combined State/Upper Subordinate Main Examination.

Controversies
The commission was embroiled in a job scam in 2022, when it was revealed that the exam papers of the Patwari exam were leaked by commission officers in collusion with other people. Ironically, the UKPSC had been given responsibility of conducting papers after the Uttarakhand Subordinate Service Selection Commission had been found involved in similar corruption and divested of its powers. A total of 36 candidates were found to have accessed the question bank after section officer Sanjiv Chaturvedi leaked it by sending photos to his wife Ritu, who provided the same to others.  

As a result, the paper was rescheduled and papers of other exams were in the process of being redrafted.

List of chairman

See also

 List of Public service commissions in India

References

External links 
 Official Website of Uttarakhand Public Service Commission
 Online Portal of Uttarakhand Public Service Commission

State public service commissions of India
Government agencies established in 2001
State agencies of Uttarakhand
2001 establishments in Uttarakhand